Supremacy may refer to:

Law
 Supremacy (European Union law), a European Union legal doctrine by which EU law has primacy of that of its member states
 The Supremacy Clause of the US Constitution, which establishes that the Constitution, Treaties and Federal statutes are the highest law in the U.S. legal system
 Acts of Supremacy, 16th century laws in England concerning King Henry VIII and the church

Culture

Film
 Supremacy (film), 2014, directed by Deon Taylor and written by Eric J. Adams
 The Supremacy, a Mega-class Star Destroyer and personal flagship of Supreme Leader Snoke in Star Wars: Episode VIII - The Last Jedi

Games
 Supremacy: Your Will Be Done (called Overlord in USA), a computer game originally released in 1990 for Amiga and Atari ST, developed by Probe Software
 The name given in the United Kingdom to the computer game Star Wars: Rebellion

Board
 Supremacy (board game), a 1984 strategic board game

Music
 "Supremacy" (song), the first track from the Muse album The 2nd Law, 2013

Albums
 Supremacy (Hatebreed album), 2006
 Supremacy (Elegy album), 1994

Other uses
 Supremacy (horse), a racehorse
 Supremacism, a philosophy that one is superior to others, or to dominate, control, or rule those who are not
 Air supremacy, the aerial control of a battlefield by one side's air force
 Petrine supremacy, in the Catholic church
 Quantum supremacy, the question of whether a quantum computer can solve a problem that classical computers cannot

See also
 
 
 Supreme (disambiguation)